Emily Rebecca Dolan (born July 22, 1994) is an American professional soccer player who plays as a goalkeeper for RCD Espanyol.

Club career
In 2016, Dolan signed for Italian side Ravenna. In 2017, she signed for Medyk Konin in Poland. In 2021, she signed for Spanish club Sporting de Huelva. On September 5, 2021, she debuted for Sporting de Huelva during a 0–0 draw with Villarreal.

References

External links
 Emily Dolan at playmakerstats.com

1994 births
American expatriate sportspeople in Italy
American expatriate sportspeople in Poland
American expatriate sportspeople in Spain
American women's soccer players
Women's association football goalkeepers
Expatriate women's footballers in Italy
Expatriate women's footballers in Poland
Expatriate women's footballers in Spain
Florida Gulf Coast Eagles women's soccer players
Living people
Primera División (women) players
Real Betis Féminas players
Serie A (women's football) players
Soccer players from Delaware
Sporting de Huelva players
Sportspeople from Wilmington, Delaware
Women's Premier Soccer League players
RCD Espanyol Femenino players
Primera Federación (women) players